Zhang Zhixi (born 7 October 1987), is a Chinese actress. She is known for her role as Lady Zhen in the historical drama The Advisor's Alliance.

Career
In 2012, Zhang made her acting debut in the war television series Glory Lane. The same year she played a supporting role in the historical comedy television series The Legend of Crazy Monk 3 and became known for her role as Chou Tianhe.

In 2013, Zhang starred in the historical television series  The Patriot Yue Fei, portraying Yue Fei's daughter Yue Anniang.

In 2014, Zhang starred in the fantasy historical drama Cosmetology High. In 2015, Zhang starred in the period romance drama The Cage of Love.

In 2016, Zhang starred in the wuxia drama The Three Heroes and Five Gallants, portraying Jin Yalan. The same year, she starred in the historical romance drama Chronicle of Life.

In 2017, Zhang starred in the historical drama The Advisors Alliance, portraying Lady Zhen. Her portrayal of the character received positive reviews, and Zhang experienced a rise in popularity.

In 2018, Zhang starred as the leading role in the historical mystery drama My Naughty Classmates as a tarot fortune-teller. The same year she was cast in the historical drama The Imperial Age, playing the role of Mongolian princess Bayalun.

In 2019, Zhang starred in the period espionage drama Spy Hunter, portraying a secret agent. She also co-starred in the fantasy romance drama Love and Destiny.
The same year she was announced as the female lead and screenwriter of historical romance drama Bright as the Moon.

Filmography

Film

Television series

Discography

References

1987 births
Living people
Beijing Film Academy alumni
Actresses from Gansu
People from Longnan
21st-century Chinese actresses
Chinese television actresses